Yle Teema was a Finnish television channel owned and operated by Finnish public broadcasting company Yle. The channel was dedicated to culture, sciences and learning. The channel was known for its "Theme Saturday" (Teemalauantai/Tema Lördag) which typically consisted of documentaries and classic international films.

Yle Teema began broadcasting on 27 August 2001. Yle Fem and Yle Teema merged on 24 April 2017 into one channel, Yle Teema & Fem.

References

External links
 Official site 

Yle television channels
Defunct television channels in Finland
Television channels and stations established in 2001
Television channels and stations disestablished in 2017